Amphiachyris amoena is a North American species of flowering plants in the family Asteraceae. It is found only in central and north-central Texas in the United States.

References

Astereae
Plants described in 1951
Flora of Texas